The 2020–21 season was Paris Saint-Germain F.C.'s 48th professional season and the club's 47th consecutive season in the top flight of French football. It was the club's 51st season in existence. In addition to the domestic league, Paris Saint-Germain participated in this season's editions of the Coupe de France, the Trophée des Champions, and the UEFA Champions League. Following the indefinite suspension of the Coupe de la Ligue, PSG did not compete in the tournament for the first time since 1995. The season covered the period from 24 August 2020 to 30 June 2021.

The season was the first since 2012–13 without Edinson Cavani, who joined Manchester United, and the first since 2011–12 without Thiago Silva, who departed to Chelsea.

Kits

Players

Transfers

In

Out

Competitions

Overall record

Ligue 1

League table

Results summary

Results by round

Matches
The league fixtures were announced on 9 July 2020.

Coupe de France

Trophée des Champions

UEFA Champions League

Group stage

The group stage draw was held on 1 October 2020.

Knockout phase

Round of 16
The draw for the round of 16 was held on 14 December 2020.

Quarter-finals
The draw for the quarter-finals was held on 19 March 2021.

Semi-finals
The draw for the semi-finals was held on 19 March 2021, after the quarter-final draw.

Statistics

Appearances and goals

|-
! colspan="16" style="background:#dcdcdc; text-align:center"| Goalkeepers

|-
! colspan="16" style="background:#dcdcdc; text-align:center"| Defenders

|-
! colspan="16" style="background:#dcdcdc; text-align:center"| Midfielders

|-
! colspan="16" style="background:#dcdcdc; text-align:center"| Forwards

|-
! colspan="16" style="background:#dcdcdc; text-align:center"| Players transferred out during the season

|-

Goalscorers

Notes

References

External links

Paris Saint-Germain F.C. seasons
Paris Saint-Germain
Paris Saint-Germain